Rutgers Glacier is a steep glacier on the west side of the Royal Society Range in the Ross Dependency, Antarctica. Rutgers Glacier descends southwest from Johns Hopkins Ridge and Mount Rucker to enter the Skelton Glacier. Abbott Spur separates the lower ends of Rutgers Glacier from Allison Glacier.

Discovery and naming

Rutgers Glacier was mapped by the United States Geological Survey (USGS) from ground surveys and aerial photographs taken by the United States Navy. The glacier was named by the Advisory Committee on Antarctic Names (US-ACAN) after Rutgers University, New Brunswick, New Jersey, which has sent researchers to Antarctica, and in association with Johns Hopkins Ridge and Carleton Glacier.

References

Rutgers University
Glaciers of Hillary Coast